"Like an Animal" is a song by Australian alternative dance group RÜFÜS. The song was released on 25 September 2015 as the second single from the group's second studio album, Bloom (2016). The song peaked at number 44 on the ARIA Chart. The song was certified platinum in Australia in 2017.

Reception
Ryan Middleton from Music Times said "The melodic indie-pop tune it brought together with a steady percussion, soft pads and airy keys for another piece of synth-pop gold from RÜFÜS".

In a review of Bloom Marcus Teague from The Guardian said ""Like an Animal" ripples with plastic guitars and stuttering hi-hats, evoking both the promise of early evening hedonism and the best of Van She."

Jacob Robinson from Daily Review, in a review of the album Bloom, said ""Like an Animal" is a glossy and pulsating EDM pop tune with a gigantic drop that descends into a hectic dance breakdown."

Music video
The music video was directed by Katzki and released on 22 September 2015.

Track listing

Charts

Certifications

Release history

References

2015 songs
2015 singles
Rüfüs Du Sol songs